Bordertown is a 1995 Australian TV miniseries, set in 1952 in a refugee camp located in a dusty, remote Australian town called Baringa (apparently inspired by a real migrant camp near the town of Bonegilla, Victoria).  The story depicts a year in the lives of the camp residents, displaced persons from World War II who are learning English and awaiting jobs and new lives in Australia.  The series starred Hugo Weaving as an English teacher, and also featured Cate Blanchett in a smaller role as an albino Italian migrant.

Reception
The series was somewhat controversial for its depiction of life in the migrant camps, and its ratings were not high.  Commenting on the 2002 video release of the series, Video Store magazine noted the "inconsistent tone" of the episodes but thought that ultimately the viewer would become "accustomed to, and fond of, these characters and their microcosm in the middle of nowhere".  DVD Talk noted the series' "original setting and generally solid acting" but found the show only "mildly interesting."

The miniseries received the AWGIE Award for Mini-Series Original in 1996.

Cast
Cate Blanchett as Bianca
Mitchell Butel as Nino Della Vergine
Linda Cropper as Bev Stafford
Petru Gheorghiu as Dante
Joe Petruzzi as Joe Della Vergine
Hugo Weaving as Kenneth Pearson
 Suzanne Gullabovska as Immigrant Girl (Sophia)

Music
Guy Gross

References

External links
 

1990s Australian television miniseries
1995 Australian television series debuts
1995 Australian television series endings
Australian Broadcasting Corporation original programming
Television shows set in Australia